Water Lady (수녀 Sunyeo) is a 1979 South Korean film written, produced and directed by Kim Ki-young. In 2019, the film was screened at the 23rd Bucheon International Fantastic Film Festival.

Plot
A literary drama telling the story of Jin-seok, a Korean veteran of the Vietnam War, and his marital life. His wife Sun-ok, runs a company that makes goods from bamboo. Her habitual stutter is passed on to their son. Jin-seok has an affair with Chu-wol, a femme fatale who schemes to ruin his family. Jin-seok manages to escape the bad influence of Chu-wol, and his son's stutter is cured.

Cast
Kim Ja-ok
Lee Hwa-si
Kim Chung-chul
Lee Ill-woong
Park Am
Lee Young-ho
Song Eok
Yu Sun-cheol
Ju Il-mong
Choe Jae-ho

References

Bibliography

External links

1970s Korean-language films
Films directed by Kim Ki-young
South Korean war drama films